Jan Joachim Tarło (born November 30, 1658, died August 13, 1732 in Vienna) was a Polish clergyman and bishop for the Roman Catholic Diocese of Poznań. He became ordained in 1719. He was appointed bishop in 1718. He died in 1732.

Jan Joachim Tarło was son of Jan Aleksander Tarło and Anna Czartoryska. His uncle was Kazimierz Florian Czartoryski, archbishop of Gniezno.

He was born on November 30, 1658, and baptized on December 26, 1658. There is no consensus among authors where he was born. According to some authors the place of his birth was Wadowice, but according to others he was born in Sandomierz Voivodeship. Tarło could be born in Wadowice Górne, which was in Sandomierz Voivodeship.

References

18th-century Roman Catholic bishops in the Polish–Lithuanian Commonwealth
1658 births
1732 deaths
People from Wadowice